Presidential elections were held in Colombia on 10 February 1914. They were the first direct presidential elections since 1860. The result was a victory for José Vicente Concha of the Conservative Party, who received 89.1% of the vote. Vicente took office on 7 August.

Results

References

Presidential elections in Colombia
1914 in Colombia
Colombia
February 1914 events
Election and referendum articles with incomplete results